General elections were held in Uganda between 11 and 28 February 1989 to elect members to the National Resistance Council. The first elections since 1980, they saw 278 members elected, of which 210 were independents.

References

Non-partisan elections
1989 in Uganda
Elections in Uganda
Uganda
February 1989 events in Africa
Election and referendum articles with incomplete results